Clinidium penicillatum is a species of ground beetle in the subfamily Rhysodinae. It was described by R.T. Bell & J.R. Bell in 1985. It is known from below the Calima Lake in Valle del Cauca Department, Colombia.

References

Clinidium
Beetles of South America
Arthropods of Colombia
Endemic fauna of Colombia
Beetles described in 1985